David Romero (1 November 1929 – 10 February 2011) was a Mexican modern pentathlete. He competed at the 1952 and 1956 Summer Olympics.

References

1929 births
2011 deaths
Mexican male modern pentathletes
Olympic modern pentathletes of Mexico
Modern pentathletes at the 1952 Summer Olympics
Modern pentathletes at the 1956 Summer Olympics
Pan American Games bronze medalists for Mexico
Pan American Games medalists in modern pentathlon
Pan American Games gold medalists for Mexico
Modern pentathletes at the 1955 Pan American Games
Medalists at the 1955 Pan American Games
20th-century Mexican people
21st-century Mexican people